Vetri Vinayagar (Tamil: வெற்றி விநாயகர்) is  1996 Tamil language Hindu devotional film directed by K. Shankar and produced by M. Sarojini Devi. The film script was written by K. P. Arivanantham. Its music was composed by M. S. Viswanathan. The film stars K. R. Vijaya, Radha Ravi, Urvasi, Nizhalgal Ravi, and Delhi Ganesh. The film was dubbed in Hindi as Jai Ganesh Deva and Telugu as Om Ganapathi.

Cast
 Master Sridhar
 K. R. Vijaya as Goddess Parvathi
 LIC Narasimhan as Lord Shiva
 Delhi Ganesh as Prohit
 Srividya as Bhuvaneswari, Prohit Wife
 Neelu as Gurukulam Head
 Nizhalgal Ravi as Parthiban
 Urvasi as Ponni
 Jai Ganesh as Ambalam
 Vadivukkarasi as Meenakshi
 Thara as Mallika
 Radha Ravi as King Kajamuka Sooran
 Geetha as Priyamala
 Shanmuga Sundaram as Goundalya Muni
 Sangeeta as Asirikai
 Master Sridhar as Narathar
Peeli Sivam as Lord Indran/Devendran
 Lalitha as Pusa Natchathiram
Gundu Kalyanam as Saadhu
 Thayir Vadai Desikan as Saadhu 2

Soundtrack

Music was by M. S. Viswanathan and lyrics were written by Kama Kodiyan.

References

External links

1996 films
1990s Tamil-language films
Films scored by M. S. Viswanathan
Films about Hinduism
Hindu mythological films
Indian biographical films
Indian films based on actual events
Hindu devotional films
Indian epic films
Religious epic films